The Lost River Athletic Conference was a short-lived IHSAA-sanctioned conference in southern Indiana, formed in 1971. Member schools hailed from Clark, Dubois, Martin, Orange, and Washington counties. Membership was never stable in its six-year span, and multiple schools held dual membership in other conferences.

 Borden played concurrently in the LRAC and SAC for the 1974-75 season.
 Eastern played in the LRAC and SAC concurrently for the 1975-76 and 1976-77 seasons.
 Shoals had dual membership in the LRAC and SWIAC for their entire duration in the conference.

References

Indiana high school athletic conferences
High school sports conferences and leagues in the United States